Percy Stanislaus McDonnell (13 November 1858 – 24 September 1896) was an Australian cricketer who captained the Australian Test team in six matches, including the tour of England in 1888.

McDonnell was born in London in 1858, son of Morgan McDonnell and his wife Frances Marie, née Bonham. In 1864 the family migrated to Melbourne, where he was educated at St Patrick's College, East Melbourne and Xavier College. He played for the Melbourne Cricket Club First XI while still at Xavier, and made his first-class debut for Victoria at the age of 17.

McDonnell was an attacking batsman and his averages are among the very best of his era. His top Test score of 147 was made in a partnership of 199 with Alick Bannerman at the SCG when the other 9 batsman in the team contributed 29 to the team score.

In 1886/87, McDonnell became the first Test captain ever to win the toss and elect to field. He had mixed results. England were dismissed for just 45, but nonetheless won the match.

McDonnell died of cardiac failure at his South Brisbane residence aged 37 and his funeral proceeded from there to the Toowong Cemetery.

Gallery

References

External links

 

1858 births
1896 deaths
Cricketers from Greater London
People educated at Xavier College
Australia Test cricketers
Australia Test cricket captains
Queensland cricketers
New South Wales cricketers
Victoria cricketers
Melbourne Cricket Club cricketers
Burials at Toowong Cemetery
Australian cricketers
English emigrants to Australia